Polyrhachis illaudata is a species of large ant found in Sri Lanka, India extending through Southeast Asia to the Philippines. The colonies have a single queen and nest within wood.

References

External links

 AntWeb

Formicinae
Insects described in 1859
Hymenoptera of Asia